21 Canum Venaticorum is a single variable star in the northern constellation of Canes Venatici, located 277 light years away from the Sun. This object has the variable star designation BK Canum Venaticorum; 21 Canum Venaticorum is the Flamsteed designation. It is visible to the naked eye as a faint white-hued star with a baseline apparent visual magnitude of +5.14.

According to Garrison et al. Cowley et al. It is a marginally chemically-peculiar star with weaker than normal helium absorption lines and displaying helium line variability.

It is around 201 million years old and is spinning with a relatively high projected rotational velocity of 96 km/s. The star has 2.73 times the mass of the Sun and 2.8 times the Sun's radius. It is radiating 72 times the luminosity of the Sun from its photosphere at an effective temperature of 11,036 K.

References

B-type subgiants
A-type main-sequence stars
Ap stars
Alpha2 Canum Venaticorum variables
Canes Venatici
Canum Venaticorum, 21
Durchmusterung objects
115735
064906
5023
Canum Venaticorum, BK